Mujiayu Town is a town located in the Miyun District of Beijing, China. It is situated at the south of Miyun Reservoir. The town shares border with Bulaotun Town in its north, Taishitun Town in its northeast, Jugezhuang and Henanzhai Towns in its south, Tanying Ethnic Township and Gulou Subdistrict in its southwest, and Xiwengzhuang Town in its west. In 2020, it was home to 23,084 inhabitants.

The town was given the name Mujiayu for it being the supposed homeland of Mu Guiying, a legendary Chinese heroine during the Song dynasty.

History

Administrative divisions 
So far in 2021, Mujiayu Town consists of 25 subdivisions, including 3 communities and 22 villages. They are listed in the table below:

Transportaion 
Mujiayu Town is connected to Beijing-Chengde Expressway. Beijing–Chengde railway and China National Highway 101 also pass through it.

Beijing Miyun Mujiayu Airport (IATA: YUN) is located here.

See also 
 List of township-level divisions of Beijing

References

Miyun District
Towns in Beijing